Area code 864 is a telephone area code in the North American Numbering Plan (NANP) for the U.S. state of South Carolina. The numbering plan area (NPA) comprises the areas of Greenville, Spartanburg, Anderson, and twelve surrounding counties in upstate South Carolina. Other cities in the 864 territory include Clemson, Gaffney, Greer and Mauldin.

The area code was split from area code 803 on December 3, 1995. Projections of 2021 anticipated the requirement for an additional overlay area code for 2024 or 2025 in the Upstate region. On November 28, 2022, NANPA set implementation dates for area code 821 January 2024 for that purpose. When the new area code becomes effective, ten-digit dialing will be mandatory.

References

External links

 List of exchanges from AreaCodeDownload.com, 864 Area Code

864
864